Proposed VFL/AFL clubs are clubs that at various points in the history of the Australian Football League have been or were distinct possibilities but either did not or have not yet eventuated.  Due to their association with the national Australian competition, they have drawn a large amount of controversy and media attention.

Formation of VFL (1896)
The VFL was formed in 1896 when Carlton, Collingwood, Essendon, Fitzroy, Geelong, Melbourne, South Melbourne and St Kilda left the Victorian Football Association. A number of other VFA clubs were touted as becoming members of the League at this time, the most notable being North Melbourne and Port Melbourne.

North Melbourne
North was denied entry due to Essendon believing that it would take its recruiting areas.

Port Melbourne
Port Melbourne was denied entry in favour of South due to its reputation of having unruly fans. North Melbourne eventually gained admission in 1925, and Port Melbourne continued to play in the VFA.

VFL expansion (1925)
Between 1919 and 1925 the VFL sought expressions of interest from clubs wishing to gain admittance to the League. While Footscray, Hawthorn and North Melbourne were accepted in 1925, a number of existing VFA clubs were considered. The VFA clubs were Brighton, Brunswick, Port Melbourne and Prahran.

One impediment that the VFL encountered when considering admitting existing VFA clubs to its ranks in 1925 was the existing recruiting districts; the VFL clubs' districts had been drawn up equitably in 1915, and clubs were unwilling to surrender portions of their districts to incoming VFA clubs. One attempt to overcome this was the Public Service Football Club, which would draw its players from the public service rather than from a geographical district. The Public Service club was formally established in 1924 and was based at the newly built Motordrome, and it applied to join the VFL in 1925; but its application was rejected and the club disbanded without playing a game.

North Melbourne (1907, 1921)
After the split between the VFL and VFA, North Melbourne became one of the stronger clubs in the VFA. In 1908, after University was admitted to the league, North Melbourne merged with West Melbourne and applied to become the tenth team in the league, under the name City Football Club; but, proposal was rejected and Richmond was admitted instead. North Melbourne and West Melbourne were kicked out of the VFA for attempting to defect, but North Melbourne returned to the VFA the same year under a new committee.

In another attempt to gain admission, North Melbourne proposed a merger with Essendon in 1921, when Essendon attempted to move to the Arden Street Oval after its home ground at East Melbourne was closed. The proposal was rejected and both clubs continued in their previous states. North Melbourne finally gained admission to the VFL in 1925.

Footscray (1919, 1922, 1923)
In the decade following World War I, Footscray became a powerhouse of the VFA. It was a rich club in a strong industrial area, and was able to recruit players aggressively from the VFL. It first applied for membership of the VFL in 1919, and then again in 1922 and 1923. It was admitted in 1925.

VFL expansion proposals
In the mid-1950s there were additional discussions and an attempt by a club to gain admission into the VFL.

Ballarat (1955)
In 1954 there was discussion within the VFL to expand the competition to include both Ballarat and Bendigo sides. In 1955 the Ballarat Football Club officially applied to join the VFL. Although the application was referred to a special sub-committee that was to meet and make a recommendation, there is no evidence that the application was ever acted on by the VFL.

Fitzroy mergers (1980, 1986, 1989, 1994, 1996)

The Fitzroy Football Club, while being a league powerhouse in the early 1900s, found itself in financial difficulties by the 1980s. A number of mergers and relocations were proposed by both the league and the club throughout the 1980s and 1990s, culminating in the club merging its playing operations with the Brisbane Bears in 1996.

National Competition proposals (since 1980)
While between 1925 and 1986 the same twelve clubs competed in the VFL, with the only exceptions being in 1942 and 1943 when Geelong went into recess due to travel restrictions, petrol rationing and loss of players to service in World War II, and in 1982 when the financially troubled South Melbourne relocated to Sydney, there were a number of developments in the 1980s when new clubs were proposed as the League became the pre-eminent competition in the country.

East Perth (1980)
In 1980 East Perth of the West Australian Football League applied to join the VFL as the League's first non-Victorian club. Nothing came of this application.

Canberra / Australian Capital Territory (1981, 1986, 1988, 1990, 1993)

The Australian Capital Territory Australian Football League was the first league from a major city to express an interest in fielding a team in a national competition as early as the 1970s, however the first official bid was made in 1981, The VFL dismissed the bid, opting for a Sydney side instead. Following the entry of the Canberra Raiders, the sport in Canberra lost major ground to rugby league. In 1990, the ACTAFL began to arrange a deal with the AFL to field a Canberra-based team in the AFL Reserves competition from 1991, which the ACTAFL hoped would later lead to senior representation. The ACTAFL had received assurances from the AFL throughout 1990 that the bid was progressing well; but progress abruptly stalled and the bid failed in August 1990 when Port Adelaide made its bid to join the AFL, drawing almost all of the AFL's strategic focus to the South Australian situation.

Norwood Redlegs (1982, 1985, 1986, 1990, 1994)

In 1982 the Norwood Football Club had sought discussions with the VFL about admissions but these met with cold responses. When Port Adelaide were privately seeking admission into the AFL during 1990, the AFL approached the club but Norwood decided to follow the SANFL's decision with its intentions undecided at the time.

Fremantle Sharks (1987)
In 1987, the first year after the admission of the West Coast Eagles to the VFL, traditional rival WAFL clubs East Fremantle and South Fremantle had discussions on the possibility of merging and joining the VFL as a second Perth-based team. The merged club was to have been known as the Fremantle Sharks, and to have played at Fremantle Oval.

Los Angeles Crocodiles (1987)

In 1987 a $10 million proposal from Perth magnate Errol Marron was put forward for a VFL expansion club based partly in Los Angeles (and partly in Melbourne) named the Los Angeles Crocodiles with profits from increased television rights to fund a local league. Stadiums in the proposal included the Los Angeles Memorial Coliseum. In October 1987 Ross Oakley announced that the VFL had officially rejected the bid.

Port Adelaide (1990)
Seven years before their debut season in the AFL, the SANFL club Port Adelaide applied to become the AFL's first South Australian club. During the 1990 preseason Port Adelaide played a practice match against the Geelong Cats at Football Park in front of 35,000. However the bid met with legal issues within South Australia resulting in the SANFL creating the Adelaide Crows.

Norwood-Sturt (1990s)
A rival bid proposed by Norwood and financially struggling Sturt to combat Port Adelaide's second bid was seriously considered during the early 1990s. When Port Adelaide won the second licence the Norwood-Sturt merger was still discussed but relations between the clubs quickly soured.

Tasmania (1992, 1994, 1995, 1997, 1998, 2008, 2021, 2022)

Tasmania is traditionally a strong Australian Football state, and as such has been touted as being a location for an AFL club. 

In October 1992 the AFL Commission voted on axing the Sydney Swans as the club had accrued over AUD $9 million dollars of debt. With Melbourne clubs siding against the Swans, the AFL was desperate to offset the potential loss of the Swans to the national competition and the AFL offered the TFL an AFL license. However the TFL declined the license fee, reported to be around AUD $4 million claiming it was "10 years away" from being ready. In addition to finding money to pay the license fee, the TFL would have faced significant travel costs to send a team to the mainland every second week. As a result of Tasmania declining a license, the AFL had to prepare a multi-million dollar assistance package to keep the Sydney club viable. 

In April 1994 The Tasmanian Sports Minister, Peter Hodgman, spoke to the AFL about the possible introduction of a local team to the league and had raised the possibility of state funding. Between 1994 and 1997 the bid was prepared for a Tasmanian team that involved the construction of a 30,000-capacity stadium at the Hobart Showgrounds in Glenorchy, at the cost of approximately $30 million. This and every subsequent bid has been declined by the AFL. The AFL's continued rejection of the Tasmanian AFL team has raised significant controversy, with the Government of Australia launching a Senate inquiry in 2008 which AFL Commission CEO Andrew Demetriou and chairman Mike Fitzpatrick both declined to attend.

Norwood Crows (1995) 
During 1995 the Norwood Football Club, with the assistance of Wolf Blass, attempted to buy the Adelaide Crows and have them relocated to the Parade.

Southport Sharks (1996)
By 1995 the Southport Sharks had reached 20,000 members began to lead the charge for a second Queensland team entering the Australian Football League. In 1996, the Sharks made their first bid to the AFL for inclusion in the national league, which was rejected by the AFL in favour of Port Adelaide's proposal.  After which, the club continued to lobby for a licence.

Further attempts were made by the club to enter the AFL including purposed mergers with North Melbourne.

Melbourne Hawks (1996)

The Melbourne Hawks would have consisted of the merger between the Melbourne and Hawthorn Football Clubs at the end of the 1996 season. Out of all the proposed merger combinations in the 1990s, it was seemed as ideal as it was known that Hawthorn had a football team which ranked as one of the best of all time but were in a dire financial situation, as opposed to Melbourne which had a sound financial base but were a club which had mostly struggled on-field since their last premiership in 1964.

Despite the controversial approval of the Melbourne Football Club board and members, the merger was voted out by Hawthorn members after a passionate campaign led by Don Scott.

Sydney Celtic (2008)
In March 2008, it was revealed by the media that the AFL had considered a radical proposal to launch an Irish-dominated team in Sydney's western suburbs, which would perform before an international audience under the "Celtic" brand name. At the time, the Irish Experiment was peaking with numerous Irish players in the AFL. The "Sydney Celtics" plan was first put to AFL chief executive Andrew Demetriou in early 2007 by Gaelic Players Association executive Donal O'Neill. It was said that the proposal originated at the International Rules series in Ireland in late 2006 when O'Neill put forward a plan to purchase an AFL licence in Sydney. The idea had been boosted by the hype generated by Tadgh Kennelly's appearance for Sydney in the AFL Grand Final, having become one of the club's better locally known players. However, the idea never materialised and the AFL has since stated that this was never a serious option and it proceeded to make plans for a new license which was to become the Greater Western Sydney Giants.

Northern Territory (2018)
In October 2018, the Government of the Northern Territory announced that it would allocate $100,000 towards a "scoping study" to investigating whether the Territory should bid for an AFL licence when it becomes available. Chief Minister Michael Gunner and AFL Northern Territory CEO Stuart Totham met with AFL CEO Gillon McLachlan in Melbourne to discuss the potential bid. It was reported that an AFL licence would not become available until 2028 at the earliest.

If successful, the team would play its home games at TIO Stadium in Darwin and at Traeger Park in Alice Springs.

Future proposals 
Listed below are potential clubs that have been suggested by lobby groups, local governments or the AFL itself as regions that the league has expressed interest in granting licences.

References

External links
 Towards a National Competition - Footy Industry

 
Lists of proposals
Proposals in Australia